Waimate  was a parliamentary electorate in the Canterbury region of New Zealand from 1881 to 1893 and from 1946 to 1957. It was represented by three Members of Parliament.

Population centres
The previous electoral redistribution was undertaken in 1875 for the 1875–1876 election. In the six years since, New Zealand's European population had increased by 65%. In the 1881 electoral redistribution, the House of Representatives increased the number of European representatives to 91 (up from 84 since the 1875–76 election). The number of Māori electorates was held at four. The House further decided that electorates should not have more than one representative, which led to 35 new electorates being formed, including Waimate, and two electorates that had previously been abolished to be recreated. This necessitated a major disruption to existing boundaries. The area for the electorate was in its entirety from the  electorate, which continued to exist with a much reduced geographic size. The southern boundary of the electorate was the Waitaki River, and the electorate was centred on the town of Waimate.

In the 1887 electoral redistribution, the electorate shifted north and became much smaller. It now shared a boundary with the  electorate. The Representation Act 1887 wrote the country quota into legislation and the Waimate electorate was classed as 100% rural (i.e. Waimate Borough had a population of less than 2,000 people at that time).

The 1941 New Zealand census had been postponed due to World War II, so the 1946 electoral redistribution had to take ten years of population growth and movements into account. The North Island gained a further two electorates from the South Island due to faster population growth. The abolition of the country quota through the Electoral Amendment Act, 1945 reduced the number and increased the size of rural electorates. None of the existing electorates remained unchanged, 27 electorates were abolished, 19 electorates were created for the first time, and eight former electorates were re-established, including Waimate.

After years of political tension, the National Government came to an agreement with the Labour Party on the redistribution provisions of the electoral law. This resulted in the 1956 Electoral Act, which significantly changed the composition of the Representation Commission; since then, there has been one member representing the government, and one the opposition, apart from all the official members. Tolerance to the electoral quota was reduced again to 5%. Combined with significant population redistributions within the islands, the boundaries of all but two electorates were altered.

History
Waimate existed from 1881 to 1893 and from 1946 to 1957.

Members of Parliament
The electorate was represented by three Members of Parliament:

Key

Election results

1954 election

1951 election

1949 election

1946 election

1890 election

Notes

References

Historical electorates of New Zealand
1881 establishments in New Zealand
1946 establishments in New Zealand
1893 disestablishments in New Zealand
1957 disestablishments in New Zealand
Waimate